The 1995–96 Courage League National Division Two  was the ninth full season of rugby union within the second tier of the English league system, currently known as the RFU Championship. Joining the seven teams who participated in 1994–95 were Northampton relegated from Courage League Division One, and Bedford Blues and Blackheath who were both promoted from the third tier.

Northampton, the champions, were promoted to the Courage League National Division One for season 1996–97 along with London Irish who were the runners–up. It was the second time Northampton had won the Division Two title and it was also the second time a team had won all of their matches in a season. Bedford Blues finished last but were not relegated to Courage League National Division Three due to the expansion of Division Two in 1996–97 to twelve teams.

Participating teams

Table

Sponsorship
National Division Two is part of the Courage Clubs Championship and is sponsored by Courage Brewery

See also
 English rugby union system

References

N2
RFU Championship seasons